The Corner Store and Office, also known as the Frogmore Emporium, Macdonald, Wilkins, and Company Store and Mark D. Batchelder Office, is a historic general store, residence and, eventually, office building located on Saint Helena Island near Frogmore, Beaufort County, South Carolina. Primarily built as a house, it was built about 1877, and is a two-story, wood-frame building with a gable roof.  It features a two-story wraparound porch.  The adjacent one-story house was built about 1905.  The store sold provisions to the islanders, most of whom were African American, and became one of the major centers of commercial and social activity on St. Helena. The home and businesses in the building were owned by Cameron Thomas and his relatives for most of the 20th century.  The family lived in the back and upstairs portion of the house, while the front included a general store and liquor store, with the small house added on used as a residence for relatives. The store also had the only gas pump on the island for many years.

It was listed in the National Register of Historic Places in 1988.

References

African-American history of South Carolina
Commercial buildings on the National Register of Historic Places in South Carolina
Commercial buildings completed in 1877
Buildings and structures in Beaufort County, South Carolina
National Register of Historic Places in Beaufort County, South Carolina
1877 establishments in South Carolina